Abu ol Folus (also known as Abowlfūlūs, Abū Folūs, and Abū ol Fūlūs) is a village in Abdoliyeh-ye Gharbi Rural District, in the Central District of Ramshir County, Khuzestan Province, Iran. At the 2006 census, its population was 63, in 9 families.

References 

Populated places in Ramshir County